Kherson State University is one of the oldest universities in southern Ukraine. Today it is a multidisciplinary academic, cultural and educational centre.

History
KSU was founded in November 1917 during the First World War, it was modeled on the evacuated Tartu Teachers Institute. In 1919 the school was reorganized into Kherson Pedagogical Institute.

In the early 1920s, the institute was renamed to Kherson Institute of Education (Hino), and in November 1924 it was given the name of NK Krupskaya. During the Second World War from August 1941 to March 1944 the Institute ceased operations.

In March 1944, after the release of Kherson from Axis invaders, it resumed the educational process in 5 departments: physical, mathematical, scientific, linguistic and literary, geographical, and historical. In 1973 it opened a Faculty of General Sciences, in 1977 a Faculty of Education, and in 1986 a Faculty of Foreign Languages.

In the years following Ukraine's independence the Institute continued to develop. In 1992, the postgraduate program at the Faculty of Philology created additional pedagogical skills and retraining of Ukrainian Philology and Foreign Languages.

In 1994 the university opened a school of physical education and sport, and Kherson Academic Lyceum at KSU. In 1998, Kherson State Pedagogical Institute was reorganized as Kherson State Pedagogical University, which in 2002 became the Kherson State University. In 2004 it established the Research Institute of Information Technology. In April 2005 it opened the Business Development Centre.

General information 
In the beginning, Yuriev Teachers’ Institute had three departments: linguistic and historical, physicomathematical, and geographic. Today Kherson State University has 12 faculties, in which there are more than 6,000 bachelor and master of full-time and part-time (distance) forms of training in 51 specialties and 17 branches of knowledge.

The Center for Postgraduate Education, Center for Preparing and Working with Foreign Citizens, and the Museum and Archives Center serve the university.

In order to implement the system of degree education, Kherson State University cooperates with schools and colleges within educational, scientific and productive complexes: “KSU – Kherson higher professional vocational school of restaurant economy”, “KSU – Beryslav Benkovsky pedagogical college”, “KSU – Kherson High School of Physical Culture”, “KSU - Kherson Polytechnic College of Odessa National Polytechnic University”.

Kherson Mishukov Academic Lyceum of the Kherson City Council functions at the university.

The university's infrastructure is represented by 6 educational buildings (one of which is an architectural monument), 3 hostels, educational workshops, a library with 6 reading rooms and 3 delivery rooms of educational literature, the fund of which is more than 500 thousand copies, internet library etc. There is also a museum of history of the university, an observatory, an agrobiostation – a botanical garden, an exhibition hall, a recording studio, an editorial and publishing department, assembly and sporting halls, sports grounds for various purposes, a cafe-pizzeria “Univer”, coffee shops in the university. There is a sanatorium-preventive treatment, a learning and training center on the Dnipro River, a sports and recreation camp “Burevisnyk” on the Black Sea coast (urban-type settlement Lazurne), a gym assigned to students and teachers of the university .

The educational process at the university is carried out by more than 600 teachers from 44 chairs, among which there are 58 Doctors of Sciences, Professors and 333 Candidates of Sciences, Associate Professors.

Among the teachers of the university are honored academics of Ukrainian and International branch academies; almost 40 scientists have honorary titles in the areas of professional activity, in particular, Honored Actors, Honored Artists and Honored Coaches of Ukraine, Honored Workers in the Sphere of Education, Science and Technology, Economics, Law, Culture, etc.

The university carries out training of higher scientific experts – Doctors of Philosophy – in 14 specialties, such as: Educational and Pedagogical Sciences, Secondary Education (in specialties), Vocational Education (in specializations), History and Archeology, Philology, Economics, Psychology, Law, Biology, Earth Science, Software Engineering.

The doctorate has 4 scientific specialties in two branches of science: pedagogical and philological.

15 scientific schools of leading Ukrainian scholars: Elyzaveta Barbina, Larysa Belekhova, Olena Blynova, Mykhailo Boyko, Tamara Dmytrenko, Olga Zabolotska, Galyna Mykhailovska, Mariia Pentyluk, Lyubov Pyetuhova, Nina Sliusarenko, Oleksandr Spivakovskyi, Vasyl Stratonov, Valentyna Fediaieva, Valentyna Sharko, Tetyana Yatsula develop and work at the university.

Three specialized scientific councils work effectively, one for the defence of doctoral dissertations on two specialties: the Theory and Methodology of Teaching (the Ukrainian Language), the Theory and Teaching Methods (the Russian Language); and two specialized academic councils for the defence of candidate dissertations on four specialties: Theory and Methods of Teaching (Mathematics), Theory and Methods of Vocational Education; Germanic Languages.

The scientific potential of the university is evidenced by carrying out over 250 conferences of international and Ukrainian levels during the past 6 years, the publication of more than 150 monographs and 50 textbooks, 600 manuals; 15 collections of scientific works, 12 of which are included in the list of scientific professional editions of Ukraine; defence of 135 candidate and 30 doctoral dissertations; the publication of about 8,000 articles in different scientific publications, including 788 in foreign ones, and 5679 in professional editions of Ukraine.

32 initiatives of scientific research laboratories as well as a scientific and practical center for the correction, rehabilitation and development of children and youth, social psychological service and a legal clinic are working at the university. KSU holds patents for inventions and utility models.

Student youth is widely involved in research work at the university. Almost 1,500 students are involved in 109 student problem groups, academic circles and design and technology bureaus.

Over the past 3 years, 172 students have been sent to participate in Ukrainian Student Olympiads, 20 of them became winners; 185 students of scientific works were sent to the Ukrainian contest of students’ scientific works on natural sciences, technical sciences and humanities; 63 students’ works were awarded.

The university successfully runs the Council of students, postgraduate students, doctoral candidates and young scientists.

During 2013-2016 young scholars of KSU received one reward of the Verkhovna Rada of Ukraine (associate professor Soloviova N.I.), three scholarships for the Cabinet of Ministers of Ukraine for young scientists (associate professors Kotova O.V., Manko and two region scholarships for young scientists in the field of Higher Education (associate professors Dumasenko S.A., Fedorchenko K.A.).

International cooperation of the university is a strategic direction of activity of Kherson State University and is aimed at integration into European and world space. The university has more than 35 agreements on cooperation with higher education partners. The main international partners with which KSU maintains links are the following foreign institutions:

 Pomeranian Academy (Slupsk, Poland);
 Adam Mickiewicz University (Poznan, Poland);
 Yan Dlugosh Academy (Czestochowa, Poland);
 Higher Economics School (Bydgoszcz, Poland);
 Alpen Adria University (Klagenfurt, Austria);
 Evangelical Froebel Seminar (Kassel, Germany);
 Stockholm University (Stockholm, Sweden);
 Comenius University (Bratislava, Slovakia);
 Baranovichi State University (Baranovichi, Republic of Belarus);
 Yanka Kupala Grodno State University (Grodno, Republic of Belarus);
 Batumi State Maritime Academy (Batumi, Georgia);
 Chernorizets Hrabar Varna Free University (Varna, Bulgaria);
 Konstantin Preslavsky University of Shumen (Bulgaria).

The university has the Department of International Relations, the EU Information Center, the Center for the Polish Language and Culture, the Center for the Spanish Language and Culture, Saints Cyril and Methodius Center for Bulgarian Culture, Friedrich Froebel Education Center.

The university prepares foreign citizens for admission to higher educational institutions of Ukraine in accredited areas of study and specialties. Foreigners from Azerbaijan, Cameroon, Congo, Moldova, Nigeria, Turkmenistan, Uzbekistan and other countries of the East and America study at KSU.

The international activity of Kherson State University is aimed at achieving the main goal of European integration: study and education of specialists of the new generation which due to the knowledge of the national and cultural features of the developed countries of the world will understand and appreciate the achievements of their native people, promote and assert Ukraine in the eyes of the European and world communities.

Serious attention is paid to extracurricular work with student youth. The system of events for organizational and educational work is planned and conducted in the university taking into account the harmonic interconnection of academic and educational processes.

Every year a number of traditional university events are held:

 Festive concert on the Day of Knowledge;
 Faculty Arts Festival “Debut”;
 Art Festival “Young Wave”.

Creative collectives of faculties participate in international, Ukrainian and regional events.

The university has created amateur artistic groups: folk dance ensembles “Chubaryky”, “Ladovytsia”, “Suziria”, educational folk theatrical group “Studi–Art”, folk vocal and choral collective of the faculty of philology and journalism, vocal-choir collective of the faculty of preschool and elementary education. KSU is very proud of them. In addition, participants in many artistic and cultural events are symphony orchestras, vocal ensembles of faculties.

Sport life rages at the university. Thanks to KSU Sports Club the University Days of Sports are held twice a year. The program of events includes volleyball, mini football, chess, athletics, street ball, volleyball-MIX, rock climbing and power lifting.

The university has sections on various sports, including volleyball, basketball, athletic gymnastics, tourism and rock climbing, athletics and chess.

Student Volunteering Center “Own Choice” participates actively in the university. This is a help for children living in orphanages and boarding schools; it's visiting children in the in-patient department of the Center for Rehabilitation of Children of the Dnipro District of Luchansky Kherson Clinical Hospital; it's a help for veterans of war and labor, students with oncological diseases. This is also a volunteer work of students in government institutions and non-governmental organizations, participation in local, Ukrainian and international charity events, scientific and educational events etc.

Campuses and buildings
The university has 6 towers and 3 dormitories. In addition, the services of students and teachers KhSU - canteen, sanatorium, medical station, water-sport station on the Dnipro, sports camp "Burevisnyk" on the Black Sea Observatory Agricultural-Botanical Garden, 3 gyms, 1 gym and 2 assembly halls, agricultural machinery fleet, dance classes, art workshops, educational and publishing center, Ukrainian cultural center, museum and archive center, exhibition hall, etc.

Faculties
Faculty of Ukrainian Philology and Journalism

Specialties:

 Secondary Education (Ukrainian Language and Literature) 
 Philology (Ukrainian Language and Literature)
 Journalism

Chair:

 Chair of Linguistics
 Chair of Ukrainian Literature
 Chair of Social Communications
 Chair of Ukrainian Language and Social Linguistics

Faculty of Culture and Arts

Specialties:

 Fine Art, Decorative Art, Restoration
 Choreography
 Musical Art
 Culturology

Faculty of Physical Education and Sports

Specialties:

 Secondary Education (Physical Training)
 Physical Culture and Sports

Chair:

 Chair of Medical and Biological Grounds for Physical Education and Sport
 Chair of Theory and Methods of Physical Education
 Chair of Olympic and Professional Sport

Pedagogical Faculty

Specialties:

 Pre-school Education
 Primary Education

Department:

 Department of Philology
 Department of Natural and Mathematical Sciences and speech therapy
 Department of Education preschool and primary education (primary education section)
 Department of Education preschool and primary education (pre-school education section)

Faculty of Economics and Management

Specialties:

 Economy
 Management
 Entrepreneurship, Trade and Exchange Activities
 Finance, Banking and Insurance
 International Economic Relations
 Secondary education (Labor Training and Technology)
 Professional Education (Technology of Production and Processing of Agricultural Products)
 Professional Education (Transport)
 Hotel and Catering Business
 Tourism

Department:

 Department of Finance and Entrepreneurship
 Chair of Economics and International Economic Relations
 Chair of Management and Administration
 Department of Hotel and Restaurant and Tourism
 Department of technological and professional education

Historical and Law Faculty

Specialties:

 Law
 International Law
 Secondary Education (History)
 History and Archeology

Chair:

 Department of History, Archeology and Teaching Methods
 Chair of History and Theory of National and International Law
 Chair of Administrative and Civil Law and Law Enforcement

Faculty of Computer Sciences, Physics and Mathematics

Specialties:

 Secondary Education (Physics)
 Secondary Education (Informatics)
 Secondary Education (Mathematics)
 Software Engineering
 Computer Science
 Information Systems and Technologies

Chair:

 Chair of Informatics, Software Engineering and Economic Cybernetic
 Chair of Physics and Methodics of its Education
 Chair of Algebra, Geometry and Mathematical Analysis

Laboratories:

 Section of Information Technology Management;
 Laboratory of Integrated Learning Environments;
 Section of Multimedia and Distance Learning Technologies;
 Laboratory of Development and Implementation of Educational Software;
 Physical Science Laboratory;
 Astronomical Observatory.

Medical Faculty

Specialties:

 Special Education
 Physical Therapy, Ergotherapy
 Secondary education (Chemistry)
 Chemistry
 Pharmacy, Industrial Pharmacy
 Medicine

Chair:

 Department of Medicine and Physical Therapy
 Chair of General and Inorganic Chemistry
 Chair of Correcting Education

Faculty of Biology, Geography and Ecology

Specialties:

 Secondary Education (Biology and Human Health)
 Secondary Education (Geography)
 Biology
 Earth Sciences
 Geography
 Ecology

Chair:

 Chair of Ecology and Geography
 Department of Human Biology and Immunology
 Chair of Botany
 Chair of Social and Economic Geography

Social-psychological Faculty

Specialties:

 Psychology
 Sociology
 Social Work

Chair:

 Chair of General and Social Psychology
 Chair of Applied Psychology
 Chair of Social Work and Social Pedagogics

Faculty of Foreign Philology

Specialties:

 Secondary Education (Language and Literature: Russian, English)
 Secondary Education (Language and Literature: English)
 Secondary Education (Language and Literature: English, German)
 Secondary Education (Language and Literature: German, English)
 Secondary education (Language and Literature: French, English)
 Secondary Education (Language and Literature: Spanish, English)
 Philology (German Languages and Literature (translation included)), first-English
 Philology (Applied Linguistics)

Chair:

 Chair of English Language and Methods of Teaching
 Department of foreign language practice
 Department of Translational Studies and Applied Linguistics
 Chair of Romanic and Germanic Languages
 Chair of Slavic Philology

Footnotes

External links
Official site
Ukrainian Wikipedia
YouTube channel
Facebook
Kherson State University - ResearchGate

Universities in Ukraine
1917 establishments in Ukraine
Educational institutions established in 1917
Kherson State University